Howard R. Mohr (December 20, 1921 – January 12, 1977) was an American politician and businessman.

Mohr was born in Forest Park, Illinois. he graduated from the Proviso-Townsend High School in 1940. Mohr served in the United States Navy during World War II. He was the owner of the Mohn Oil Company and was involved in the fuel oil and equipment business. Mohr served as Mayor of Forest Park and was a Republican. Mohr served in the Illinois Senate from 1967 until 1977. Mohr died in Springfield, Illinois after becoming ill at a retirement breakfast. Mohr did not seek re-election in 1976.

Notes

1921 births
1977 deaths
People from Forest Park, Illinois
Military personnel from Illinois
Businesspeople from Illinois
Mayors of places in Illinois
Republican Party Illinois state senators
20th-century American politicians
20th-century American businesspeople
United States Navy personnel of World War II